Christopher Innes (1941 – 19 June 2017) was a Canadian historian of English Arts, a Canada Research Chair and Distinguished Research Professor at York University. He was a Fellow of the Royal Society of Canada.

References

2017 deaths
Academic staff of York University
20th-century Canadian historians
1941 births
Fellows of the Royal Society of Canada
Canada Research Chairs
Historians of theatre